Carl Melles (born Melles Károly; 15 July 1926 – 25 April 2004) was an Austrian orchestral conductor of Hungarian descent.

Personal life 
He married Hungarian noblewoman Judith von Rohonczy (1929–2001), daughter of an actress, Ila Lóth. They are parents of actress Sunnyi Melles, who is married to Prince Peter zu Sayn-Wittgenstein-Sayn.

Work 
He conducted Wagner's Tannhauser at the 1966 Bayreuth Festival.

Sources 
 Howell, Christopher. "Forgotten Artists. An occasional series by Christopher Howell. 23. Carl Melles (1926–2004)" MusicWeb International July 2017.

1926 births
2004 deaths
Musicians from Budapest
Austrian people of Hungarian descent
Male conductors (music)
Hungarian conductors (music)
Hungarian male musicians
20th-century Austrian conductors (music)
20th-century Austrian male musicians